James William Baxter (born 3 August 1990) is an English stage and film actor known for his roles as Jake Doland in Emmerdale,  Anthony in Alma's Not Normal, Leroy in Still Open All Hours, and Jesus in Red Dwarf.

Early life
Baxter was born and brought up in Sunderland, Tyne and Wear and educated at Farringdon Community Sports College. He attended weekly classes at NADA (the Northern Academy Of Dramatic Arts) held at the city's Royalty Theatre. Whilst there he appeared in various productions including Some Like It Hot and the pantomime Aladdin (Christmas 2006).

Career

Stage
In the Fiona Evans stage play Scarborough at the 2007 Edinburgh Festival, his performance as a teenager embarking upon an illicit affair with his PE Teacher won him a best-actor nomination for a Festival Fringe Award, and favourable reviews.

He has played in the North East musical Fine Fine Fine based on a story by Denise Robertson.

Baxter created the role of Bruce Blakemore in Silk Road by Alex Oates at Assembly Studios as part of the Edinburgh Festival 2014.

Television
In 2007, Baxter landed the role of Jake Doland, in the long running ITV soap opera Emmerdale. Baxter left the soap in 2009, together with his on-screen family, at the conclusion of their storyline. In 2012, Baxter played Jesus (of Caesarea) in the episode "Lemons" of the sci-fi sitcom Red Dwarf. He also had a bit part in the BBC's The Revenge Files of Alistair Fury, filmed on Tyneside, and played Alan Maddison in the ITV World War II drama Joe Maddison's War. In November 2013, he joined the cast of Hebburn as a guest in series two.

Since 2013, Baxter has played the role of Leroy in the BBC1 series Still Open All Hours, the revival series of Open All Hours.
In 2021, Baxter played the role of  Anthony in Alma's Not Normal on BBC2.

In 2022, Baxter was cast as Joe Casey in the new series of Waterloo Road.

Radio
Imaginary Boys: As part of BBC Radio 4s Afternoon Play strand, James played 17-year-old schoolboy David in a Paul Magrs play. David is followed by, and falls in love with, an alien called Lawrence. Lawrence is a noveliser from Verbatim 6, a species that is also featured in Magrs' Big Finish audio book 'Find and Replace' and 'Ringpullworld'.

Personal life 
In 2018, he began dating actress Chelsea Halfpenny, and they announced their engagement on 13 June 2021.

References

External links
 

1990 births
Living people
People from Sunderland
Male actors from Tyne and Wear
21st-century English male actors
English male radio actors
English male soap opera actors
English male stage actors
Actors from County Durham